New car smell is the odor that comes from the combination of materials found in new automobiles, as well as other vehicles like buses, trucks, and aircraft. Although the scent is described as pleasant by some, there is some question about the possibility that these chemicals pose a health risk.

Chemical composition 
Both the scent and what produces it vary somewhat in different kinds of cars. Most of the interior of an automobile consists of plastic held together with a number of adhesives and sealers. Such materials release volatile organic compounds, via outgassing or off-gassing.  These fumes are generally attributed to mixtures of many different chemicals off-gassing and to plasticizers, although their vapor pressures are very low and they are not considered volatile.

Researchers tested more than 200 U.S. vehicles of model years 2011–2012 for chemicals such as organobromine compounds (associated with brominated flame retardants, or BFRs), organochlorine compounds (e.g., polyvinyl chloride, or PVC), and heavy metals that off-gas from various parts such as the steering wheel, dashboard, armrests, and seats.

It is recommended to keep new cars well-ventilated while driving, especially during the summer. A 1995 analysis of the air from a new Lincoln Continental found over 50 volatile organic compounds, which were identified as coming from sources such as cleaning and lubricating compounds, paint, carpeting, leather and vinyl treatments, latex glue, and gasoline and exhaust fumes. An analysis two months after the initial one found a significant reduction in the chemicals. The researchers observed that the potential toxicity of many of these compounds could pose a danger to human health.

The total volatile organic compound levels can reach 7,500 micrograms per cubic meter. Concentrations decayed by approximately 90% over a three-week period. Over sixty chemical compounds were identified inside the interiors of the four vehicles in this study.

In some instances, the odor results from a manufacturing defect. According to official documents of Bentley Motors (BT26), an "obnoxious odor" in Bentley cars for model years 1999–2002 was traced to a rust inhibitor.  In some cultures, the new car smell is not considered desirable and manufacturers work to eliminate it.

Health hazards 
A two-year study released in 2001 by the CSIRO in Australia found several health problems associated with these chemicals. CSIRO research scientist, Dr. Stephen Brown, reported anecdotal accounts of disorientation, headache, and irritation in some drivers of new cars. He measured pollutant levels in new cars that were sufficient to cause similar effects within minutes in controlled experiments by other researchers. Chemicals found in the cars included the carcinogen benzene, two other possible carcinogens cyclohexanone and styrene, and several other toxic chemicals.

A more recent study in Japan found that the volatile organic chemicals in a new minivan were over 35 times the health limit the day after its delivery. In four months levels had fallen under the limit but increased again in the hot summer months, taking three years to permanently remain below the limit. The limits were set by the Japanese health ministry in response to more car owners suffering from sick building syndrome. A Daily Telegraph article on the study described the enjoyment of new car smell as "akin to glue-sniffing".

However, another study showed little toxicity in new car odors.

The most common side effects of the new car smell are headaches, sore throats, nausea, and drowsiness.

References

Further reading 

Car culture
Odor
Air pollution
Transport and the environment
Car ownership